The Wassenaar was a Dutch 64-gun third rate ship of the line of the navy of the Dutch Republic and the Batavian Republic, and the Royal Navy.
The order to construct the ship was given by the Admiralty of the Meuse. The ship was commissioned in 1781.
In 1783/1784, the Wassenaar sailed to Batavia under Captain Gerardus Oorthuis.

In 1795, the ship was commissioned in the Batavian Navy.

On 11 October 1797 the Wassenaar took part in the Battle of Camperdown under Captain Adolph Holland. HMS Triumph then sailed on to the centre of the battle, and when the Wassenaar was fired on by a Dutch brig, the crew raised the Dutch colours again. But in the end they were captured again by the British.

As HMS Wassenaar, the ship first served as a troop ship. In February 1798 she was the flagship of Admiral Joseph Peyton in the Downs. In the years 1800-1802 she served in the Mediterranean. In her final years (1802-1815) she lay at Chatham as a powder hulk, until she was finally sold for breaking up in 1818.

References

Ships of the line of the Dutch Republic
Ships of the line of the Batavian Republic
Ships of the line of the Royal Navy
Ships built in Rotterdam
1781 ships
Maritime incidents in 1797